Slave Coast can mean:

 the Slave Coast of West Africa
 the Dutch Slave Coast